The Youyang anti-missionary riot occurred in Youyang,  southeast of Chongqing, Sichuan Province, China in 1865. It was one of many riots in and around Chongqing in the 19th century.

Background
In 1862, a French mission arrived in Youyang and built church. Some of the local converts, under the church umbrella, run rampant, forcing neighbors to convert, arousing resentment.

Event 
In February 1865, hundreds of angry crowds ransacked the church. On August 27, 1865, people protested the bullying missionaries. Two days later, about ten people got into a verbal argument with a French missionary, and beat him to death.

Aftermath 
Sichuan viceroy ordered the death of a local and paid 80,000 taels of silver indemnity to the French.

See also
Anti-missionary riots in China
Catholic Church in Sichuan

References

1865 in China
Catholic Church in Sichuan
Christianity in Chongqing
History of Chongqing
1865 in Christianity